Dendrorycter marmaroides is a moth of the family Gracillariidae. It is primarily found in Hokkaidō island of Japan.

The wingspan is 7-8.8 mm.

The larvae feed on Alnus hirsuta and Alnus japonica. They mine the stem of their host plant. The mine has the form of a long linear mine, just beneath the surface along the axis of the young stem or branch.

References

Gracillariinae
Moths of Japan